Avelar is a civil parish of the municipality of Ansião, Portugal. It was a vila during two occasions: for the first time from November 12, 1514 through December 31, 1836; and for the second time from June 21, 1995 to the present day.

Etymology
The name avelar is said to come from the Latin avellanale or avellanal, related to hazels (Corylus avellana).

The name was later appended to the town as a result of the Jewish expulsions from Spain (1391, 1492) and the subsequent resettlement of Jews in Portugal.

History

Antiquity
An old Roman pathway connecting Conímbriga (modern day Condeixa) to Sellium (modern day Tomar) passed through the location of modern-day Avelar.

Medieval history
The first known reference to Avelar is from the year 1137, when Afonso Henriques (not yet King of Portugal) cites an "Avellaal" on the foral granted to Penela.

In November 1221, King Afonso II, the grandson of Afonso I, gave the Avelar estate to Martim Anes, his  (the standard-bearer of the Portuguese military of the time).

Renaissance and early modern history
In November 1497, King Manuel I names Fernão de Pina, Rui Boto and João Façanha as officials of the Forals of the Court, with the intention of starting a reform of the old forals. Seventeen years later, on November 12, 1514, Avelar was granted its foral, officially declaring it a town (vila).

Then came the Portuguese succession crisis of 1580 and, with it, the Iberian Union. The union ended with the Portuguese Restoration War, but the Marquesses of Vila Real, then owners of the Avelar estate, supported the right of the Spanish Kings to the Portuguese throne. Because of this, King John IV of Portugal accused them of treason, and had their properties and riches confiscated, including the Avelar estate. Those confiscated goods were later passed on to the House of the Infantado, created by King John IV himself as an appanage for the second eldest son of the Portuguese monarch.

On December 31, 1836, due to a royal decree, Avelar loses its title of vila and becomes part of the concelho of  until 1855. It then becomes part of the concelho of Figueiró dos Vinhos. In 1895, it finally becomes part of the concelho of Ansião, of which it remains to this day. This timeline, however, is disputed: other sources list Avelar as being a part of Figueiró dos Vinhos in as early as 1832 (adding to the confusion, the term used to refer to Figueiró dos Vinhos is "district", but districts were only officially defined in April 1835).

Modern history
On June 21, 1995, Avelar regains its position as a vila. Since 2018, the town celebrates the anniversary of this event during the "Vila of Avelar Week".

In 2020, the III Vila of Avelar Week was scheduled to take place from the 14 to the 21 of June, but was ultimately cancelled due to the COVID-19 pandemic. Instead, the celebration was shortened to a single, brief "Day of Vila of Avelar" public meeting on June 21, taking necessary precautions to prevent further spread of the virus.

Population

Administration

Executive body
As of February 2020, the president of the executive body of Avelar (Junta de Freguesia) is Fernando Inácio Pires Medeiros.

Legislative body
As of February 2020, president of Avelar's legislature (Assembleia de Freguesia) is Dina Maria Caseiro Henriques Rosa, of the Social Democratic Party.

See also
 Avella, a town in southern Italy.

References

Freguesias of Ansião